Adela of France, known also as Adela the Holy or Adela of Messines; (1009 – 8 January 1079, Messines), was, by marriage, Duchess of Normandy (January – August 1027), and Countess of Flanders (1035–1067).

Family
Adela was the second daughter of King Robert II of France and Constance of Arles. She is usually identified with Adela who in January 1027 married Duke Richard III of Normandy. The marriage was short-lived for on 6 August of that same year Richard III suddenly died. This identification is in doubt as Adela was sent in infancy to be raised in the Flemish court. Adela married Count Baldwin V of Flanders in 1028.

Countess of Flanders
Adela managed to gain influence in the policy of Flanders, through her family connections, and was described as very proud of her rank, a pride she passed on to her children. She had been given a higher education than normal for a woman by monks from the St Peter's convent in Ghent and could speak and read Latin, which she taught to her children.  It is evident that she was an active political partner of her spouse. Half of the charters issued by him are co-signed by her (often with the title "Sister to the King of France"), which was far from a given thing for a consort.  She was particularly active within church reform, such as enforcing the clerical celibacy.

On the death of her brother, King Henry I, the guardianship of his seven-year-old son King Philip I fell jointly on his widow, Anne of Kiev, and on his brother-in-law, Adela's husband, so that from 1060 to 1067, they were regents of France.

Adela had a strong interest in Baldwin V's church reforms and was behind her husband's founding of several collegiate churches. Directly or indirectly, she was responsible for establishing the Colleges of Aire (1049), Lille (1050) and Harelbeke (1064) as well as the abbeys of  Messines (1057) and Ename (1063).

Monastic life
After Baldwin's death in 1067, she went to Rome, took the nun's veil from the hands of Pope Alexander II and retired to the Benedictine convent of Messines, near Ypres. 

In 1071, Adela's third son, Robert the Frisian, planned to invade Flanders even though at that time the count of Flanders was Adela's grandson, Arnulf III.  When she heard about Robert's plans, she asked Philip I to stop him. Philip sent soldiers to support Arnulf including a contingent of ten Norman knights led by William FitzOsborn. Robert's forces attacked Arnulf's numerically superior army at Cassel before it could organize, and Arnulf was killed along with William FitzOsborn. Robert's overwhelming victory led to Philip making peace with Robert and investing him as count. A year later, Philip married Robert's stepdaughter, Bertha of Holland, and in 1074, Philip restored the seigneurie of Corbie to the crown.

Adela died in the convent of Messines and was buried at the convent. Honoured as a saint in the Roman Catholic Church, her commemoration day is 8 September.

Family
Her possible first marriage was in 1027 to Richard III, Duke of Normandy (died 1027). They had no children.

Her marriage in 1028 was to Baldwin V, Count of Flanders (died 1067). Their children were:
 Baldwin VI, Count of Flanders (–1070).
 Matilda of Flanders (–1083). In  she married William, Duke of Normandy, the future King of England and had issue.
 Robert I, Count of Flanders (–1093).

Notes

References

1009 births
1079 deaths
11th-century French people
11th-century French women
11th-century Norman women
Countesses of Flanders
Duchesses of Normandy
French princesses
House of Capet
House of Normandy
Adele of France
Daughters of kings
Remarried royal consorts